The Lithuanian Basketball Federation, also known as LKF, is a national governing body of basketball in Lithuania. It was founded in 1936, but due to Soviet occupation, the federation disappeared from FIBA. It was reinstated in 1991, following the Independence of Lithuania. In 2011, the famous basketball player, Arvydas Sabonis, was elected as the commissioner of the federation.

Accomplishments 
 EuroBasket
 1937: Champions
 1939: Champions (also hosted)
 1995: 2nd place
 2003: 1st place
 2007: 3rd place
 2013: 2nd place
 2015: 2nd place

 Summer Olympic Games
 1992: 3rd place
 1996: 3rd place
 2000: 3rd place
 World Cup
 2010: 3rd place
 U-19 World Cup
 2003: 2nd place
 2011: Champions
 U-20 European Championship
 1996: Champions
 2005: 2nd place
 2008: 2nd place
 2012: Champions
 2016: 2nd place
 2022: 2nd place
 U-18 European Championship
 1994: Champions
 2006: 2nd place
 2008: 2nd place
 2010: Champions
 2012: 2nd place
 2014: 2nd place
 U-16 European Championship
 2008: Champions
 2009: 2nd place
 2010: 2nd place
 2015: 2nd place
 2016: 2nd place
 2022: Champions

Leagues 
 LKL: premier men's basketball league (founded in 1993)
 NKL: secondary men's basketball league (founded in 2005)
 LKAL: secondary men's basketball league (founded in 1994, disbanded in 2005)
 LMKL: premier women's basketball league (founded in 1994)
 LSKL: student basketball league (founded in 1998)
 MKL: elementary student basketball league (founded in 2001)
 LKVL: veteran basketball league

Commissioners 
 Stanislovas Stonkus – served from 1990 till 1994.
 Algimantas Pavilonis – served from 1994 till 2003.
 Vladas Garastas – served from 2003 till 2011.
 Arvydas Sabonis – served since 2011 till 2021.
 Vydas Gedvilas – serving since 2021

External links 
 

Basketball in Lithuania
Basketball
1936 establishments in Lithuania
Sports organizations established in 1936